Sisimiut, formerly known as Holsteinsborg, is the capital and largest city of the Qeqqata municipality, the second-largest city in Greenland, and the largest Arctic city in North America.

Sisimiut literally means "the residents at the foxholes". The site has been inhabited for the last 4,500 years, first by peoples of the Saqqaq culture, then Dorset culture, and then the Thule people, whose Inuit descendants form the majority of the current population. Artifacts from the early settlement era can be found throughout the region, favored in the past for its plentiful fauna, particularly the marine mammals providing subsistence for the early hunting societies. 
The population of modern Greenlanders in Sisimiut is a mix of the Inuit and Danish peoples, who first settled in the area in the 1720s, under the leadership of the Danish missionary, Hans Egede.

Today, Sisimiut is the largest business centre north of the national capital of Nuuk and is one of the fastest growing cities in Greenland. Fishing is the principal industry in Sisimiut, although the town has a growing industrial base. KNI and its subsidiary Pilersuisoq, a state-owned chain of all-purpose general stores in Greenland, have their base in Sisimiut. Architecturally, Sisimiut is a mix of traditional, single-family houses, and communal housing, with apartment blocks raised in the 1960s during a period of town expansion in Greenland. Sisimiut is still expanding, with the area north of the port, on the shore of the small Kangerluarsunnguaq Bay reserved for a modern suburb-style housing slated for construction in the 2010s. Several professional and general schools are based in Sisimiut, providing education to the inhabitants of the city and to those from smaller settlements in the region. The new Taseralik Culture Centre is the second cultural centre to be established in Greenland, after Katuaq in Nuuk.

The city has its own bus line, and is the northernmost year-round ice-free port in the country, a shipping base for western and northwestern Greenland. Supply ships head from the commercial port towards smaller settlements in more remote regions of Uummannaq Fjord, Upernavik Archipelago, and as far as Qaanaaq in northern Greenland. Sisimiut Airport, the town airport is served by Air Greenland, providing connections to other towns on the western coast of Greenland, and through Kangerlussuaq Airport, to Europe.

History

Prehistory

Saqqaq culture

Sisimiut has been a settlement site for around 4,500 years, with the people of the Saqqaq culture arriving from Arctic Canada during the first wave of immigration, occupying numerous sites on the coast of western Greenland. At that time, the shoreline was up to several dozen meters above the present line, gradually decreasing in time due to post-glacial rebound. The Saqqaq remained in western Greenland for nearly two millennia. Unlike the following waves of migrants in the millennium following their disappearance, the Saqqaq left behind a substantial number of artifacts, with plentiful archeological finds on the coast of Davis Strait, from Disko Bay in the north—to the coast of Labrador Sea near Nuuk in the south.

Research at the Asummiut excavation site near the airport has uncovered the changing settlement pattern, exhibiting transition from the single-family dwellings to tiny villages of several families. The types of dwelling varied from tent rings made of the hides of hunted mammals, to stone hearths, with no evidence of communal living in larger structures. In contrast, there is evidence for reindeer hunting as a coordinated effort of either villagers or groups of more loosely related individuals, with gathering places in proximity of the hunting grounds being found. Despite recent advances in DNA research based on hair samples from the ancient Saqqaq migrants (which gives insight into their origin), the reason for the decline and subsequent disappearance of the culture are not yet known.

Dorset culture

After several hundred years of no permanent habitation, the second wave of migration arrived from Canada, bringing the Dorset people to western Greenland. The first wave of immigrants, known as Dorset I, arrived around 500 BCE, inhabiting the region for the next 700 years. The early Dorset people were followed later by the Dorset II people, although no artifacts have been discovered from the later era around Sisimiut, and few artifacts from the era of Dorset I have been uncovered in archaeological sites, with the finds often limited to harpoon heads and numerous animal bones. The largest number of Dorset culture artifacts can be found further north in the Disko Bay region, while the further to the south, the poorer the finds, disappearing completely on the coast of Labrador Sea in southwestern Greenland.

Thule people

The Inuit of the Thule culture—whose descendants form the majority of the current population—arrived nearly a thousand years ago, with the first arrivals dated to approximately 13th and 14th century. The Thule people were more technologically advanced than their Dorset predecessors, although they still relied on subsistence hunting, with walruses, reindeer, and particularly the fur seals constituting the base of the economy in the early period.

The shoreline was still at a higher altitude than today, with the Sisimiut valley east of the Kangerluarsunnguaq Bay, partially under sea. Many artifacts and graves from the several centuries of permanent settlement remain scattered in the region. Rich in fauna, the coastal region from Sisimiut to Kangaamiut was particularly attractive for migrants, and due to a large number of historical artifacts it is currently listed as a candidate for the UNESCO World Heritage Site, with the application received in 2003.

Colonial era
There are no signs of Norse settlement in the region. It was not until Jacob Severin was granted a full monopoly on the Greenlandic trade and permitted to act as an agent of the Danish navy that the Dutch were finally removed in a series of battles in 1738 and 1739.

The present town was established in 1764 by the General Trade Company as the trading post of Holsteinsborg ("Fort Holstein"), named for the first chairman of the Danish College of Missions in Copenhagen which underwrote and directed the missionary work in the colony. At the time of its founding, the Kalaallisut name of the place was Amerlok, after its fjord. The colonists formally established several villages in the region, of which only two remain to this day: Itilleq and Sarfannguit. Under the Royal Greenland Trading Department, Holsteinsborg was a centre of the trade in reindeer skins.

Several 18th-century buildings still stand in Sisimiut, among them the 1725 Gammelhuset ("Old House") and the 1775 Bethel-kirken ("Bethel Church") or Blå Kirke ("Blue Church"), the oldest surviving church in Greenland. The buildings were moved from the former site of the settlement at Ukiivik (Holsteinsborg) together with the rest of the settlement. The new church on the rocky pedestal was built in 1926, further extended in 1984. The entrance to the yard with the old church and other protected historical buildings is decorated with a unique gate made of whale jawbone. In 1801, a smallpox epidemic decimated the population of Sisimiut and other coastal settlements, although the population growth quickly resumed due to plentiful marine life on the coast.

20th and 21st centuries
The 20th century saw industrialization, through the construction of a shipping port, and a fish processing factory of Royal Greenland in 1924, the first such factory in Greenland. Fishing remains the primary occupation of Sisimiut inhabitants, with the town becoming the leading centre of shrimping and shrimp processing. Until 2008 Sisimiut had been the administrative centre of Sisimiut Municipality, which was then incorporated into the new Qeqqata Municipality on 1 January 2009, with Sisimiut retaining its status as the administrative centre of the new unit, consisting also of the former Maniitsoq Municipality and the previously unincorporated area of Kangerlussuaq. The municipal council, seated in the town hall and headed by Mayor Hermann Berthelsen, consists of 13 members, including the mayor and his deputies, and representatives of the four primary political parties of Greenland: Siumut, Atassut, Democrats and Inuit Ataqatigiit.

Geography

Kangerluarsunnguaq Bay

Immediately to the north of Sisimiut a small inlet of Davis Strait, the Kangerluarsunnguaq Bay, separates the town from the Palasip Qaqqaa massif in the north, at the southern foot of which the town airport is located.

The bay is navigable in its entirety, protected from the open sea by a series of skerries in the west. Both the local port and the local sailing harbor are located on the southern shore of the bay. The  road to the airport passes through the bridge over the Kangerluarsunnguaq Bay. Halfway between the town and the airport there is a small beach of dark sand. The beach, as well as the skerries off the coast, are very popular in the summer.

Alanngorsuaq

To the east, a wide valley extends into the interior of the peninsula, bounded from the north by the conjoint massif of Palasip Qaqqaa and Majoriaq, dissected by the Qerrortusup Majoriaa valley alongside which leads the Polar Route from Sisimiut to Kangerlussuaq.

In the middle of the valley towers a standalone Alanngorsuaq mountain, surrounded by several lakes, one of which serves Sisimiut town as a water reservoir. The entire area of the valley is another popular picnic destination, with easy access to the water reservoirs by a gravel road in the middle part of the valley.

Nasaasaaq

The Nasaasaaq ridge has several summits. The ridge terminates in a  trabant overlooking Sisimiut. The southern wall of Nasaasaaq falls directly to Amerloq Fjord. The northern wall is not a uniform surface, dissected by ledges, dihedrals, and ramps.

The main access route to the summit leads through one of the ramps to the saddle between the main summit and its western trabant. The passage on the top cone is secured by ropes for unprepared tourists. One of the variants of the Polar Route follows the coast of Amerloq Fjord at the base of the southern wall of Nasaasaaq. The main summit is visited for its long-range view of the coast, although more limited to the north than that of Palasip Qaqqaa to the north of the town airport. An alternative route to the top of interest to mountaineers leads through the hard to find low pass to the east of the main summit, and from there directly on the summit cone ridge.

Climate
Sisimiut has a polar tundra climate (Köppen climate classification ET). Precipitation is very low in Sisimiut, with the greatest amount of rainfall occurring in the second half of the year, between July and December, with August and September being the wettest months. The sea winds from Davis Strait moderate the climate, with the area known for its fogs. Sisimiut has midnight sun from 3 June to 9 July, but there is no true polar night in winter time.

Demographics

Population 
With 5,582 inhabitants in 2020, Sisimiut is one of the fastest-growing towns in Greenland, with migrants from the smaller settlements reinforcing the trend. Apart from Kangerlussuaq, it is the only settlement in the Qeqqata municipality exhibiting stable growth patterns over the last two decades.

The gender imbalance is evident in Sisimiut, with men consistently outnumbering women during the last two decades, running from 20% in 1991, to 13% in 2000 and 2010. Nearly 10% of the town's inhabitants in 2010 were born outside Greenland, a decline from 16.5% in 1990 and 11.8% in 2000.

Housing

Most families in Sisimiut live in single-family houses, most often the traditional colorful wooden prefabricated homes shipped from Denmark, and almost always raised or supported by a concrete foundation due to permafrost. 
In the 1960s, Danish authorities began construction of communal apartment blocks in most towns in Greenland, including Sisimiut.

Unlike in Nuuk, the modern environmentally friendly construction technologies have not yet arrived to Sisimiut, and in 2010 the existing communal-block district remained in a state of partial disrepair. The Qeqqata municipality however is planning the town expansion in the 2010s, with the area north of the Kangerluarsunnguaq Bay reserved for real estate. The new neighborhood will bear the name Akia.

Economy and infrastructure

Industry and services
Fishing is the principal industry in Sisimiut, with harvested stocks of shrimps, salmon, halibut and cod. The Royal Greenland fish processing plant at the port is the largest within Greenland and is amongst the most modern shrimp-shelling factories in the world. In 2008, supplied by 8 boats and the factory trawlers, the plant processed an annual amount of 20,180 tons of shrimp, around 1,680 tons per month. This was roughly constant throughout the year, although when fish catches were larger the fish was frozen. The plant eventually sold around 6,019 tonnes of shrimp. Hunting is also important to some of the local livelihoods, mainly seals, walrus, beluga whale, narwhal, reindeer and muskoxen.

KNI and its subsidiary Pilersuisoq, a state-owned chain of all-purpose general stores in Greenland, are based in Sisimiut. The Pilersuisoq chain operates in all small settlements in the country, as well as smaller towns which are not covered by supermarket chains. A range of shops operate in Sisimiut, from chain supermarkets of Pisiffik and Brugsen to independent outlets, also serving supplies to the smaller settlements in the region. Polaroil, a liquid fuel distribution company, is headquartered in Sisimiut. It employs 70 staff and operates 70 stations in Greenland. The headquarters were moved from Maniitsoq to Sisimiut in the late 2000s. In 2010 KNI announced plans to also move the operational base of Polaroil from Maniitsoq to Sisimiut, causing protests in the former community already experiencing depopulation. Other facilities include two banks, a library, a Post Greenland office and a small hospital/health centre with 19 beds.

There are advanced plans for the Alcoa aluminium smelting plant. Maniitsoq, the second-largest town in the municipality, is another proposed location alongside Sisimiut. The plant would provide employment for 600–700 people, or more than 10% of the population. As it is a vital decision for the town, wide public consultations were carried out in 2008–2010 by both the town authorities and the Government of Greenland in order to address potential environmental and social concerns. The Sisimiut Hydro Power Plant is located north of the town.

Although rainfall is low, Sismiut has abundant natural supplies of fresh, drinkable surface water, collected from a reservoir under Alanngorsuaq. Water is also pumped to the waterworks from another lake around 2.5 kilometers away in the mountains. The water mains are preinsulated and electrically heated to supply the residents during the winter months. The water supply network is capable of producing some 882,000 cubic meters of water per year; two water-supplying lakes by the town have a combined annual minimum capacity of more than 7.2 million cubic meters.

Tourism
Tourist facilities in Sisimiut include several youth hostels and hotels, such as Hotel Sisimiut with Restaurant Nasaasaaq, and Seaman's Home, and a conference centre. The other restaurant of note is the Misigisaq Restaurant, located at the harbor. It is the only Chinese restaurant in the country and it uses Greenlandic ingredients cooked in the Chinese style. The town has a heated open-air swimming pool, which is supported on stilts so that the heat does not melt the permafrost. Several camping sites are located in Sisimiut valley and near the Kangerluarsunnguaq bay. During winter, a ski lift operates at the foot of the Alanngorsuaq mountain, at the base of the northern slopes of Nasaasaaq.

Tourism is becoming increasingly important, with several outfitter companies based in town. Year-round operations offered include dogsledding, heliskiing, guided hiking, mountaineering, kayaking, and boating. The race was inaugurated in 1998, since then becoming an international competition.

Education and culture

The Knud Rasmussen High School (Knud Rasmussenip Højskolia), founded in 1962, is located on the eastern outskirts of the town, west of the old heliport site. Apart from the traditional curriculum, it provides specialized courses in Greenland history and culture including skin preparation and ski instruction. The school is also notable for its special unit, the Women's High School added in 1977, and focusing on traditional arts. During summer, the school building is used as a hostel. In autumn 2002, the school was responsible for erecting a series of stone sculptures around Sisimiut: near the airport, in the municipal building, at the Gertrud Rask Minde children's home, at Arnat Ilinniarfiat and around the school itself.

The other educational centres in Sisimiut are: Sanaartornermik Ilinniarfik, the construction engineering school with capacity for 200 students, the Arctic Technology Centre; Piareersarfik, the vocational institution for the service industry professionals, and Oqaatsinik Pikkorissarfik, a foreign language school.

Sisimiut Museum

Located in a historical building near the harbor, the Sisimiut Museum specializes in Greenlandic trade, industry and shipping, with artifacts based on ten years of archaeological research and excavations of the ancient Saqqaq culture settlements near the town, offering an insight into the culture of the region of 4,000 years ago.

The museum also hosts a collection of tools and domestic items collected during 1902–22, an inventory from the Old Church with the original altarpiece dated to approximately 1650, and paintings from the 1790s. The peat house reconstruction of an early 20th-century Greenlandic residence with domestic furniture is part of an outdoor exhibition. The exhibition includes the remains of a kayak from the 18th century and the Poul Madsen collection, a collection of handcraft, art, house items and ethnographic objects compiled over fifty years. The Greenlandic stone exhibition is housed in the Bygge og Anlægsskolen building.

Arts and crafts
The modern Taseralik Culture Centre is located in the eastern part of Sisimiut, on the shore of the Nalunnguarfik lake. The centre often hosts traveling theatre troupes, as well as concerts, from classical to folk music. The Sisimiut Culture Day on 21 November is also celebrated at Taseralik. Greenlandic handicrafts, created in a workshop located in an old warehouse on the old harbor, are sold in the Greenland Travel Incoming's Arts n' Craft, and in several small shops along the main street. Greenland stones and sealskin products are created in the Natseq and Panigiit workshops.

Transport

Air

Before the airport was opened in the 1990s, Sisimiut had been served by the now-closed heliport, located on the eastern outskirts of the town, in the Sisimiut valley. The airport has a short,  runway suitable only for STOL airplanes. Travel outside of Greenland is routed with a change of planes at Kangerlussuaq Airport. Air Greenland operates scheduled services to Nuuk, Maniitsoq, and Ilulissat. Taxis as well as an infrequent town bus service connect the airport with the centre of Sisimiut.

Sea

For most of the year, Sisimiut is served twice-weekly by coastal ferries of Arctic Umiaq Line which link the communities of the western coast. There is also a weekly Royal Arctic Line ferry to Itilleq and Sarfannguit. The port in Sisimiut is the northernmost year-round ice-free port in Greenland, serving as the country's primary maritime base north of Nuuk. Supply ships from the port head north, serving the entire coast, from the Uummannaq Fjord region, through Upernavik Archipelago, to Qaanaaq in the far north. M/S Akamalik, one of the largest ships in the fleet of Royal Greenland, is based in Sisimiut. Home to the first shipyard of Greenland dating from 1931, the port also handles more than 50 cruise liners per year. The local kayak club operates at the bay harbor east of the port.

Ground
Roads in Sisimiut, including the road to the airport, are surfaced, but there is no proper road linking Sisimiut to any other settlement, like in all of Greenland. The town has its own bus network. In winter dog sled routes are used to link to settlements further north. Snowmobiles are, as a more modern approach, also used. Transport within a town is usually done by foot, although both private cars and the city bus – which drives loops through town – are popular.

In the 2000s construction of the  road to Kangerlussuaq has been discussed for several years. The road would be the first of its kind in Greenland, connecting two far-away settlements, and reducing the need for passenger and freight exchange at Kangerlussuaq Airport, the Air Greenland hub. The cost of around €40 for a proper paved road prevented construction, but instead a decision was made to build a very simple gravel road for terrain adapted vehicles. The road was in construction along the route during 2021 and was finished all the way during 2022, at a cost of 25 million DKK (€3).

Twin towns
Sisimiut is twinned with:
 – Albertslund Municipality, Denmark
 – Klaksvík, Faroe Islands

Sisimiut has friendship links with:
 – Whitstable, United Kingdom

Notes

References

 
Populated places in Greenland
Cities and towns in Greenland
Populated places of Arctic Greenland
Populated places established in 1764